James Jackson "Red" Phillips (February 5, 1936 – March 25, 2015) was an American football wide receiver who played for the Los Angeles Rams and the Minnesota Vikings for 10 seasons, from 1958 to 1967. Phillips was a three-time Pro Bowler as a Ram from 1960 to 1962 and was first-team in 1961.  Phillips attended Auburn University.  He was on 11 All-American teams his senior year at Auburn. He was co-captain on Auburn's 1957 national championship team.

NFL career

As a rookie in 1958, Phillips led the NFL with the longest reception for that season: 93 yards.  In 1961, he led the NFL in total receptions with 78.

Post NFL

After leaving the NFL, Phillips held coaching positions with the Atlanta Falcons, San Diego Chargers, New Orleans Saints, and Florida State.  He later ran a successful insurance business and was appointed to the Alabama Department of Insurance.

Phillips was inducted into Alabama Sports Hall of Fame in 1985. In 2004, Phillips was named Auburn's SEC Football Legend for the SEC Championship Game of that year.

Personal life

Phillips married "Mickey" Kennedy in 1957. They had three children. Phillips died on March 25, 2015 at Bethany House (Hospice) in Auburn.

References

1936 births
2015 deaths
All-American college football players
American football wide receivers
Atlanta Falcons coaches
Auburn Tigers football players
Los Angeles Rams players
Minnesota Vikings players
Western Conference Pro Bowl players
People from Alexander City, Alabama
Players of American football from Alabama